Attention, Turtle! is a 1970 Soviet comedy film directed by Rolan Bykov.

Plot 
Two schoolchildren decide to conduct an experiment on a turtle. They want to put it under the tank. But their classmate named Tanya will do everything possible to prevent them.

Cast 
 Alexei Yershov as Vova Vasilyev  
 Andrei Samotolkin as Vova Didenko
 Mikhail Martirosyan as Vova Manukyan 
 Galina Budanova as Tanya Samokhina 
 Yelena Ryabukhina as Ella
 Galina Verbitskaya as Bella
 Maryana Smirnova	as Katya Egorova	
 Aleksey Batalov as Tanya's grandfather
 Iren Azer as Anna Sergeevna the Teacher
 Lillian Malkina as Vova Vasilyev's grandmother
 Zoya Fyodorova as Viktoria Mikhailovna 
 Rina Zelyonaya as scientific secretary
 Rolan Bykov as Vova Didenko's grandmother (uncredited)
 Aleksandr Filippenko as tank commander
 Nina Maslova as primary school teacher

References

External links 
 

1970 films
1970s Russian-language films
1970s teen comedy films
Mosfilm films
Films directed by Rolan Bykov
Russian children's comedy films
Soviet teen comedy films
Films set in schools
Films set in the Soviet Union
Films shot in Moscow
Soviet children's films